The bridges spanning the Bosphorus strait in Istanbul, Turkey are:

 Bosphorus Bridge, also called the First Bosphorus Bridge, a suspension bridge
 Fatih Sultan Mehmet Bridge, also known as the Second Bosphorus Bridge, a suspension bridge
 Yavuz Sultan Selim Bridge, also known as the Third Bosphorus Bridge, a suspension bridge

See also
 Bosphorus Strait#Crossings

Bosphorus
bridges
Bridges spanning the Bosphorus strait
Bridges spanning the Bosphorus strait